Bell Station may refer to:
 Bell Station, California
 Bell station (METRORail), in Houston, Texas
 Bell station (TRE), a commuter rail station in Fort Worth, Texas
 Bell Station, a former name of Zinfandel, California
 Bell railway station, Melbourne in Victoria, Australia